Adriana Dunavska (born 21 April 1969) is a Bulgarian individual rhythmic gymnast. She is the 1988 Olympic All-around silver medallist, 1987 World All-around silver medallist, 1989 World All-around bronze medallist and the 1988 European All-around champion. She also won a gold medal at the 1987 World Championships with the rope. Her twin sister, Kamelia Dunavska was also a competitive rhythmic gymnast.

Biography
Dunavska was born on 21 April 1969. She was a star pupil at club CSKA  in her hometown, where she was coached by Borislava Kuichkova until she was selected for the national team. She was one of the Golden Girls of Bulgaria that dominated Rhythmic Gymnastics in the 1980s. She made her international debut breakthrough with her 4th-place finish at the 1986 European Championships.

In 1984, rhythmic gymnastics officially became an Olympic sport . At the Olympics in Seoul, the Bulgarian Gymnasts competed against Soviet gymnasts – Marina Lobach and Olexandra Tymoshenko. Her teammate Bianka Panova dropped a club in the preliminary competition, which eventually kept her out of the medals. Dunavska performed very well. She won the silver medal in All-around competition behind soviet gymnast Marina Lobach. She is her country's only Individual Olympic medallist in rhythmic gymnastics.

Besides her Olympic silver from the 1988 Seoul Olympics, Dunavska had a successful career with many gold, silver and bronze medals at World and European championships. At the European Championships in Helsinki in 1988, she became the All-around gold medalist as well as winning gold with ribbon, clubs, and hoop. A year earlier, Dunavska was second at the 1987 World Championships in Varna.

The 1989 World Championships would be Dunavska's final competition. After grabbing the bronze in the all-around she capped off her career by performing in all four event finals, where she won silvers with ball and ribbon.

References

External links

 https://web.archive.org/web/20140420124013/http://sporta.bg/?load=OtherSports::Champion&id=259 ( Golden Girls of Bulgaria )

1969 births
Living people
Bulgarian rhythmic gymnasts
Gymnasts at the 1988 Summer Olympics
Olympic medalists in gymnastics
Olympic gymnasts of Bulgaria
Olympic silver medalists for Bulgaria
Bulgarian expatriate sportspeople in France
Medalists at the 1988 Summer Olympics
Medalists at the Rhythmic Gymnastics World Championships